Joaquín Gómez may refer to:

Joaquín Gómez Mira (born 1941), Spanish oncologist
Joaquín Gómez (guerrilla) (born 1947), Colombian guerrilla leader
Joaquín Gómez (rower) (born 1967), Mexican rower
Joaquín Gómez (football manager) (born 1986), Spanish football coach
Joaquín Gómez (athlete) (born 1996), Argentine hammer thrower